Ebenhaeser is a settlement in West Coast District Municipality in the Western Cape province of South Africa.

A mission station of the Rhenish Missionary Society at the mouth of the Olifants River in the former Vanrhynsdorp district was established here by a German named Wurmb in 1831. The name, a version of Ebenezer, is of biblical origin (1 Sam. 7:12) and means 'stone of help'.

References

Populated places in the Matzikama Local Municipality